The following is a list of South-West Indian Ocean tropical cyclones in the 1950s decade, before the 1959–60 season.

Storms

February 1950 Mozambique Channel cyclone
A cyclone was first observed northeast of Madagascar on February 9. The storm moved west-southwestward, crossing northern Madagascar on February 13. The storm moved across the Mozambique Channel and struck eastern Mozambique on February 15. The circulation moved across much of Africa, eventually reaching northern Namibia (then known as South-West Africa).

April 1952 Tanzania cyclone
On April 13, 1952, a tropical cyclone was first observed north of the Comoros. The cyclone moved west-southwestward toward the coast of Africa at a low latitude. The storm weakened over land and turned southwestward, moving into northern Mozambique. The cyclone left 34 fatalities in Tanzania. The HMEAS Rosalind assisted in delivering food, equipment, and soldiers to the region around Lindi.

January 1953
A tropical cyclone originated northeast of the northern tip of Madagascar on January 8. It moved southwest at first before curving west, passing the outer islands of the Seychelles. The storm curved to the south and struck Mayotte, causing heavy damage in the capital city Dzaoudzi. Turning to the southeast, the cyclone moved ashore northwestern Madagascar near Mahajanga on January 13, where damage totaled over MF2 million (US$1 million) after three housing quarters were destroyed. Throughout Madagascar, 12 people died related to the cyclone. The storm continued southeastward after moving ashore and later turned back to the southwest, dissipating on January 19.

Cyclone Astrid

See also

South-West Indian Ocean tropical cyclone
1950s Australian region cyclone seasons
1950s South Pacific cyclone seasons
Atlantic hurricane seasons: 1950, 1951, 1952, 1953, 1954, 1955, 1956, 1957, 1958, 1959
Pacific hurricane seasons: 1950, 1951, 1952, 1953, 1954, 1955, 1956, 1957, 1958, 1959
Pacific typhoon seasons: 1950, 1951, 1952, 1953, 1954, 1955, 1956, 1957, 1958, 1959

References

South-West Indian Ocean cyclone seasons
Lists of tropical cyclones